Gabrielle Tuite (born December 7, 1977) is an American model and actress. She was formerly one of the models on the game show, The Price Is Right and discovered when seen at numerous movie premieres with then-reality show icon Evan Marriott.

Tuite was born in Brooklyn, New York. She started in the field of acting and modeling at the age of 11. She was in TV commercials, and magazine ads at first, and went on to act in TV and movie roles. Tuite was selected to advance to the last 28 candidates of the 2004 WWE Diva Search, but was not chosen to be one of the 10 finalists. She appeared with actor Sebastian Siegel on the December 2004 cover of Iron Man. She is perhaps most well known as one of the former rotating prize models on the long-running U.S. game show The Price Is Right.

Filmography
 Cabin Fever 2: Spring Fever (2009) - June
 Little Hercules in 3-D (2009) - Aphrodite
 Iron Man (2008) - Stan's Girl
 Stiletto - Druggie Girl #2
 A Modern Twain Story: The Prince and the Pauper (2007) - Red Carpet Interviewer #1
 Miss Castaway and the Island Girls (2004) - Billie Jean
 Las Vegas (2004) - Natalie Valentine
 18 Wheels of Justice (2000)
 Deuce Bigalow: Male Gigolo (1999) - Beautiful Porsche Woman
 USA High (1997) - Lynn

References

External links 

Gabriell Tuite's Official site

1977 births
Female models from New York (state)
American film actresses
American television actresses
Game show models
Living people
People from Brooklyn
21st-century American women